{{safesubst:#invoke:RfD|||month = March
|day = 18
|year = 2023
|time = 07:07
|timestamp = 20230318070702

|content=
redirect Al Bundy

}}